The Conlon family is a prominent Irish noble family, the original Gaelic spelling being Ó Connalláin. In the tenth and eleventh centuries, the O'Conalláin were Princes of Ui Laeghari, an extensive territory in the counties of Meath and Westmeath, where the High King of Ireland historically derived his seat at the Hill of Tara. The O'Conlons were chiefs of Crioch Tullach, in County Tyrone and branches of this family in the twelfth and thirteenth centuries settled in the counties of Roscommon, Galway and Mayo. As a sept of the Northern Uí Néill, they claim descent from Niall of the Nine Hostages and his son Conall Gulban, both High Kings of Ireland.

Name 
O'Conlon is a variation of the anglicised version of Ó Connalláin. The name may be derived from two Irish Gaelic words "Con" (the genitive case of Cú, meaning "hound") and "Lón" meaning lion - thereby implying a person who has the characteristics of a lion born of a hound - strength and speed.  It is sometimes spelt Conlan, Conlen and Conlin.  Like most surnames, it is occasionally used as a first name.

Origins 
The O'Conlons are a sept of the Cenél Conaill, or "kindred of Conall", specifically descended as part of Cenél Aedha, through Aedha mac Ainmirech great-great grandson of Conall Gulban. His father, Ainmirech mac Sétnai is brother of Lugaid mac Sétnai, founder of the Cenél Luighdech. The Cenél Aedha are said to have given their name to the barony of Tirhugh (Tír Aedha) in County Donegal.

Their kingdom was known as Tír Conaill, with their powerbase at Mag Ithe in the Finn valley, however they gradually expanded to cover what is now counties Donegal and Fermanagh. The Cenél Conaill clashed regularly with their kin the Cenél nEogain, eventually capturing the latters original power-base of Ailech in the Inishowen peninsula—in modern-day County Donegal—by the 12th century. Related dynasties descended through Conall Cremthainne and Diarmait mac Cerbaill included the Síl nÁedo Sláine, the kings of Brega, descended from Colmán Már's youngest brother Áed Sláine and the Kings of Uisnech, among others, belonging to Clann Cholmáin.

Through the common ancestry of  Lóegaire mac Néill, the O'Conlons are also related to the O'Connell family, including Count Daniel Charles O'Connell, Eibhlín Dubh Ní Chonaill and the O'Connell Baronets.

Several prominent figures originating from the Tir Conail kingdom included Maximilian, Count von Tyrconnell.

People 
Other people from the Conlon family include:
 Barry Conlon (born 1978), Irish football player
 Charles M. Conlon (1868–1945), American photographer
 David Conlon (born 1982), Irish mathematician
 Edward Conlon (born 1965), a New York police officer and author
 Fred Conlon (1943–2005), an Irish sculptor
 Gerry Conlon (1954-2014), a member of the Guildford Four
 James Conlon (born 1950), an American conductor
 John Conlon (born 1989), hurler with Clonlara and Clare GAA
 Kelly Conlon (born 1969), an American bass guitarist
 Mary A. Conlon (1870–1936), an American elementary school principal who founded Walton High School
 Paddy Conlon (publican), the founder of the town of Narembeen in Western Australia
 Patrick Conlon (artist), an American tattooist and comics illustrator
 Patrick Conlon (politician) (born 1959), an Australian politician
 Patrick "Giuseppe" Conlon, a member of the Maguire Seven
 P. J. Conlon (born 1993), Irish-American baseball player
 Paul Conlon (born 1966), Australian former professional rugby league footballer
 Paul Conlon (footballer) (born 1978), English former footballer
 Peter Conlon, American politician
 Richard Conlon (born 1965 in Hemel Hempstead), is an English playwright
 Robert Daniel Conlon (born 1948), U.S. Catholic bishop
 Sarah Conlon (1926–2008), Irish activist
 Sean Conlon (born 1981), singer-songwriter
 Spot Conlon, a fictional character in the 1992 film Newsies
 Tim Conlon (disambiguation), multiple people
 Tom Conlon (born 1996), English footballer
 Conlon Nancarrow (1912–1997), an American composer who took Mexican citizenship in 1955
Thomas Connellan (1640–1698), Irish composer
Mary Connellan, (fl. c. 1720), harpist
William Connellan (fl. mid-17th century, brother of Thomas), Irish harpist
Lawrence O'Connellan (fl. 1756), from Sligo, Dominican Superior of Louvain
Thady Connellan (1780-1854), Irish teacher and scholar
Owen Connellan (1797–1871), Irish historian
Thomas Connellan (priest) (1855–about 1920), Irish priest
Edward Connellan (1912–1983), Australian aviator; founder of Connellan Airways
Leo Connellan (1928–2001), American poet
Joe Connellan (died 1967), Irish newspaper editor and politician
Ray Connellan, Irish sportsperson
 Marie Christine Conlon (born 1985), American Graphic Designer and Illustrator

Bibliography 

 
 "Meath-county Tartan - Kinloch Anderson". www.kinlochanderson.com. Retrieved 2021-10-04
 
 The O Clery Book of Genealogies, Seamus Pender (ed.), in Analecta Hibernica, No. 18, 1951 pp. 1-198
 Burke, Bernard and Ashworth Peter Burke, A Genealogical and Heraldic History of the Landed Gentry of Ireland. London: Harrison & Sons. 9th edition, 1899.
 Marquis de Ruvigny, Melville H., The Nobilities of Europe. London: Melville and Company. 1910. (repr. Adamant Media Corporation, 2000

Other 
 Conlon v Ozolins, a New Zealand court case

See also
Irish nobility
Irish kingdoms / kings

References 

Irish nobility
Irish noble families